Gandhi Under Cross Examination is a 2009 book written by G. B. Singh and Dr. Tim Watson evaluating the iconization of Mohandas Karamchand Gandhi as a civil rights protagonist. 

In 1893, Gandhi went to South Africa where, by his own account, he was thrown off a train on racial grounds. In their scrutiny of the incident and Gandhi's statements thereafter, the authors claim that Gandhi gave divergent accounts of what happened on his journey to Pretoria. Gandhi Under Cross-examination catalogs the incidents that happened around that time and attempts to prove that the train incident never occurred. The authors have claimed that Gandhi lied about the train incident.

See also
Gandhi Behind the Mask of Divinity
Zulu War of 1906
Gandhi's role in Zulu War

References 

2009 non-fiction books
Books about Mahatma Gandhi